The 2003 Team Ice Racing World Championship was the 25th edition of the Team World Championship. The final was held on ?, 2003, in Saransk, in Russia. Russia won their ninth title.

Final Classification

See also 
 2003 Individual Ice Speedway World Championship
 2003 Speedway World Cup in classic speedway
 2003 Speedway Grand Prix in classic speedway

References 

Ice speedway competitions
World